Cerion prestoni is a species of terrestrial gastropod in the family Cerionidae, endemic to Preston by Nipe Bay, Cuba. This species is morphologically similar to other cerionids in the 'scalarinum complex', however it differs from most species in having thick, striated ribs. This species complex represents an interesting divergence in Cuban cerionid forms, possessing several unique features.

References 

Gastropods described in 1951
Fauna of Cuba
Cerionidae
Endemic fauna of Cuba